Victor Wayne Glasgow (January 17, 1926 – December 31, 2000) was an American basketball player. He played in college for Oklahoma University where he was a two time All-Big Seven selection. Glasgow passes playing in the NBA to play for the Phillips Petroleum Co. 66er's AAU team.

He was part of the United States Olympic basketball team at the 1952 Summer Olympics which won the gold medal. He played in six games.

References

External links
profile

1926 births
2000 deaths
Basketball players at the 1952 Summer Olympics
Basketball players from Oklahoma
Medalists at the 1952 Summer Olympics
Minneapolis Lakers draft picks
Northwestern Oklahoma State Rangers men's basketball players
Oklahoma Sooners men's basketball players
Olympic gold medalists for the United States in basketball
Phillips 66ers players
United States men's national basketball team players
American men's basketball players
Guards (basketball)